The M6 Bomb Service Truck is a truck that was produced by Chevrolet during World War II. The M6 was a  4x4 truck that was used to tow M5 Bomb Trailers around on airfields. It could move up to five M5 trailers at once. It either used a Beebee winch, a Holan Hoist, or a modified version of the Braden winch.

It could also be used to tow ammunition around an ammunition dump. The truck was designated as an M6 Chevrolet Bomb Service Truck. It is believed that Chevrolet produced about 7,000 of these trucks during World War II. It was soon replaced by GMC CCKW-based M27 Bomb Service Truck.

Specifications 

Design and use 

The M6 Bomb Service Truck, unlike many other trucks in its family, had an open cab with no solid roof and no doors. It normally had a canvas roof over the driver's compartment. In hotter areas, the canvas roof could be removed and the windshield folded down for extra ventilation.

It had a rear area where it could carry ammunition, since it could be used in ammunition dumps to carry ammunition around the dump. The M6 also was equipped with a winterization kit that included: an insulated battery box with a heating coil, a gasoline heater to heat the battery, and a petcock for the bottom of the fuel tank (for easy releasing of cold air and pressure from the gasoline tank).

Winches and hoists used 
Before mid-1943, the M6 was not equipped with a spare tire and had a Beebee hoist, while after mid-1943 the Beebee hoist was replaced with either a Holan hoist or a modified version of the Braden winch. With the winches and hoists, the M6 could haul up to five M5 Bomb Trailers at once around airfields.

Production history 
7,000 M6s were produced by Chevrolet in World War II from 1942 to September 1944. It ended production because a new bomb truck, the M27, which was based on the GMC CCKW, entered production.

See also 
 List of U.S. military vehicles by supply catalog designation (G-7128)

References

Citations

Bibliography

Government documents

Journal
 

Military trucks of the United States
Chevrolet trucks
Military vehicles introduced from 1940 to 1944